Zaheera is an Indian actress. She debuted in the James Bond movie On Her Majesty's Secret Service in 1969. Credited as Zara, she played the role of an Indian girl. She acted in Bollywood movies over the next decade. She appeared in a lead role for the first time in Call Girl (1974), a movie with a controversial theme at that time. She also had roles in Aadmi Sadak Ka and Naukri. One of her hit films was Gambler with Dev Anand, Shatrughna Sinha, Zahida and Jeevan. She has worked in a few Punjabi movies as well. She used to write her name as Zaherra.

Filmography

 On Her Majesty's Secret Service (1969): Zara
 The Gambler (1971) (as Zahira): Julie
 Anokha Daan (1972)
 Anjaan Raahen (1974): Sunita
 Alingan (1974)
 Call Girl (1974): Maya/Kamini
 Toofan Aur Bijlee (1975): Madhuri/Sheela
 Zinda Dil (1975): Rekha
 Mere Sartaj (1975): Parveen J. Gulrez
 Ek Hans Ka Joda (1975): Tina
 Dharmatma (1975) (as Zahirra)
 Harfan Maulaa (1976) (as Zaherra): Qawali Announcer
 Taxi Taxie (1977): Jyoti Sharma
 Saal Solvan Chadya (1977): Bubbly
 Aadmi Sadak Ka (1977) (as Zaherra): Vandana Tandon
 Kaala Aadmi (1978)
 Aahuti (1978): Kusum
 Naukri (1978): Ramola
 Khuda Kasam (1981) (as Zahira): Latika
 Shakka (1981) (as Zaherra): Meena
Do Khiladi (1976)

References

External links
 

Indian film actresses
Living people
Actresses in Hindi cinema
Year of birth missing (living people)
Actresses in Punjabi cinema